The U.S. Poultry & Egg Association is an American industry trade group located in Tucker, Georgia that "represents its poultry and egg members through research, education, communications and technical services."

Founded in 1947, it is the world's largest and most active poultry organization. Billed as an "All Feather" association, membership includes producers and processors of broilers, turkeys, ducks, eggs, and breeding stock, as well as allied companies.

It currently has affiliations in 26 states and member companies worldwide. They also sponsor the International Poultry Expo.

The group posts position papers on topics related to poultry and egg production, including controversial and timely topics such as factory farming, genetically modified organisms, induced molting for egg-laying chickens, regulatory efforts, and avian influenza.

External links
U.S. Poultry & Egg Association
International Poultry Expo

Food technology organizations
Food industry trade groups
Egg organizations
Poultry organizations
Companies based in Tucker, Georgia
Tucker, Georgia